Suraiya Shahab (1945 – 13 September 2019) was a Pakistani newscaster, poet, and novelist. She worked as a news presenter at Radio Pakistan, Pakistan Television, BBC Urdu, and German radio Deutsche Welle from the 1960s to the 1990s.

Early life and education
Suraiya was born in 1945. She earned her Masters in journalism and political science. Later, she was also pursuing a Ph.D. in political science but dropped out after being diagnosed with cancer.

Career
Suraiya began her broadcasting career in the 1960s by voicing in dramas at Radio Pakistan, Karachi. Later, she was selected for a magazine program by  Radio Iran Zahedan. The program became the reason for her success and fame.
After spending over ten years in Zahedan, she returned to Pakistan in 1973 and became associated with Pakistan Television and Radio Pakistan until she was selected for BBC Urdu Service in 1984.
In the 1990s, she moved to Germany and worked for many years for the German national radio Deutsche Welle. During her long stay in Frankfurt, she authored 2 novels, a collection of fiction, and a collection of poetry.

Personal life
Suraiya first married her colleague Nazrul Isalm Afza while she was working for the radio in Karachi, who was a Bengali artist. Later, they moved to Iran. Two of her three children were born in Iran. During the early 80s, her first husband passed away. Her second husband was from Germany. She had two sons and a daughter.

News presentations

Books
 "Khud Se Aik Sawal" — a collection of Urdu poems and ghazals
 Safar Jari Hai (Urdu novel)

Philanthropy
From the platform of a welfare organization called "Youth League", Suraiya participated in several welfare works.

Death
Suraiya died on the morning of Friday, September 13, 2019, at the age of 75. She was suffering from  Dementia due to a surgery of her brain. She was sick from 2002 until 2019 as her mental health was deteriorating badly. She passed away at her eldest son's place. She was buried in the local cemetery of Islamabad.

References

1945 births
2019 deaths
Pakistani women journalists
Pakistani television newsreaders and news presenters
Pakistani women radio presenters